St. John the Baptist Diocesan High School is a private, Roman Catholic high school in West Islip, New York.  It is operated by the Roman Catholic Diocese of Rockville Centre.

Faculty

Faculty members at St. John's are required to possess a master's degree, and have New York State Teacher Certification.
St. John's student to teacher ratio is approximately 16:1.

Uniform
All students must wear the official school uniform appropriate for season, grade year, and assigned gender to school. School shoes can be purchased through White Cross and uniforms through Flynn O’Hara Uniforms in Plainview, New York. If a uniform is worn improperly, a uniform infraction or a detention will be issued. Skorts are worn by the female class body and must be worn at an appropriate length or detentions will be issued by the faculty.
Also introduced during the 2007–2008 school year were identification cards. All students and faculty must wear their ID card with an official lanyard around their neck when they enter a building as a safety precaution. If a student forgets their ID cards three times, detention is issued.

School layout and building

The high school features five floors. The first three floors hold all of the classrooms while the fourth and fifth floor were built as a convent. The fourth floor houses a conference center where there is a space for different school events. St. John's also has a dance studio, a large renovated library (as of September 2016), newly renovated lecture hall (as of September 2011), new athletic stadium bleachers (as of September 2009).  The school contains the newly renovated gymnasium (as of September 2012), upgraded cafeteria (as of September 2018), and a 1300-seat auditorium.

Academics
The basic curriculum includes required courses in Science, Math, Religious Studies, English, Social Studies, Physical Education, Foreign Languages (French, Italian, or Spanish), Health, Fine or Performing Arts, and Computer Science. All students graduate with a New York State Regents diploma after successfully completing the Regents examinations and coursework.  

A student receives a report card 4 times during the school year, as well as  4 Progress Reports. Final grades for full year courses are determined by calculating 20%  for each quarter and then 10% for the midterm/regents exam and 10% for the final/regents exam.

Three levels of classes are offered at St. Johns. Honors, Advanced Placement and regents courses. Also, college credit courses are offered through St. John's affiliates such as St. John's University, Molloy College and the New York Institute of Technology. Students placed in the SJB College extension program can work to earn 30 college credits (one year of college) before graduating from St. John's.
 
Over the past six years, over 99% of St. John's graduates have gone on to college. St. John's graduates have been accepted to and graduated from such prestigious schools and universities as Harvard, Princeton, Yale, Carnegie-Mellon, Lehigh, Dartmouth, Georgetown, University of Southern California, Holy Cross, Columbia, Notre Dame, Boston College, Emory, Johns Hopkins, all major military academies and more.

Music and arts
The six performing instrumental groups are the Symphonic Band, String Orchestra, Symphony Orchestra, Jazz Ensemble, Percussion ensemble, and Wind Ensemble. The three performing vocal groups are Women's Chorus, Himphonix, and the Bel Canto Chorale, which has won various awards and performed in Carnegie Hall. The three vocal groups perform at concerts twice a year, in December and in the spring, and perform extra concerts outside of St. John's. The school also has two a Capella groups, Note-orious and Noteworthy, which perform once a year in the school's Pops Concert. The annual Dance Show showcases the talent and work of students in Danceworks, the company (the competitive dance team) and the students from each of the dance courses as well as the student choreographers. The school Pep Band performs during half-time of varsity football and basketball games.

St. John's has a dedicated student art gallery for student work to be displayed in student themed art shows four times a year.

St. John's has a musical and a drama production program. Some musical productions put on by SJB include Crazy for You, Oliver!, Godspell, Anything Goes, Bye Bye Birdie, Footloose, Peter Pan, The Sound of Music and Thoroughly Modern Millie. The most recent musicals were Footloose (2015), The Little Mermaid (2016), Rodgers and Hammerstein's Cinderella (2017), The Music Man (2018), Beauty and the Beast (2019), The Wiz (2020), Anything Goes (2022), and Newsies (2023). The drama club has performed Neil Simon's Odd Couple, Rumors, Arsenic and Old Lace, and Just Another High School Play.

Clubs and activities
St. Johns has many extracurricular activities, all are moderated by faculty members. Clubs may be discontinued if they do not have a high attendance.

Athletics 

The St. John's athletic program competes on freshman, JV and varsity levels. The men's and women's teams compete at regional and state levels in 18 sports. St. John the Baptist is a member of the Nassau-Suffolk Catholic High School Athletic Association (NSCHSAA)of New York. Common competitors of St. John the Baptist High School include other high schools in the Roman Catholic Diocese of Rockville Centre. 

Teams:

Notable alumni

 Class of 2005, '05, serial killers
 Ed Henry, American news anchor
 LeRoy Homer Jr., '83, airline pilot that was the first officer of the hijacked United Airlines Flight 93 that crashed in Shanksville, Pennsylvania during the September 11 attacks
 Joseph Lhota, '72, former chairman of the Metropolitan Transportation Authority and candidate in the 2013 New York City mayoral election
 Logan O'Hoppe, '18, professional baseball catcher for the Los Angeles Angels
 Joe Palumbo, '13, professional baseball pitcher for the Texas Rangers
 Mike Petke, '94, former professional soccer player and head coach of Major League Soccer club Real Salt Lake
 Chris Wingert, '00, professional soccer player for New York City FC in Major League Soccer

References

External links 
 

Catholic secondary schools in New York (state)
Islip (town), New York
Educational institutions established in 1966
1966 establishments in New York (state)
Roman Catholic Diocese of Rockville Centre
Schools in Suffolk County, New York